Alone Again is an album by American country music singer George Jones. It was released in 1976 via Epic Records. The album includes the single "Her Name Is".

Track listing 
 "A Drunk Can't Be a Man" (George Jones, Earl Montgomery)
 "Ain't Nobody Gonna Miss Me" (Jones, Montgomery)
 "Stand on My Own Two Knees" (Jan Crutchfield, Roger Bowling)
 "You're the Best Living" (Jody Emerson)
 "Over Something Good" (Emerson)
 "Her Name Is" (Bobby Braddock)
 "I'm All She's Got" (Emerson)
 "She Needs Me" (Montgomery, Emerson)
 "Right Now I'd Come Back and Melt in Her Arms" (Emerson)
 "Diary of My Mind" (Sadie M. Starks, John Starks)

References

External links 
 Alone Again at Discogs
 George Jones' Official Website
 Record Label

1976 albums
George Jones albums
Albums produced by Billy Sherrill
Epic Records albums